Bass Building may refer to:

Bass Building (Tonopah, Nevada), listed on the National Register of Historic Places
Tom Bass Building, Harris County, Texas, 9-1-1 headquarters building named for Tom Bass (politician)

See also
Bass House (disambiguation)
Bass Mansion (disambiguation)